Isla El Morro, Isla del Morro or Farallón del Obispo is a small, rocky island in Acapulco Bay, about 200 m in front of the beach Playa Condesa.

At the northern side is a landing. From there, along a collapsing staircase, the highest point can be reached, where eroding installations of a former fountain from the eighties can be found.

See also
Acapulco Bay
Morro Bay, California

External links
 History of the island on Facebook (span.)
 Picture of the former fountain

Acapulco
Islands of Guerrero
Uninhabited islands of Mexico